William John Fellner (born Fellner Vilmos on May 31, 1905 – September 15, 1983) was a Hungarian-American economist and Sterling Professor of Economics at Yale University from 1952 until his retirement in 1973. Born in Budapest, Austria-Hungary, he studied at the University of Budapest, the ETH Zurich and the Frederick William University in Berlin, where he received his Ph.D. in economics in 1929, one year after Wassily Leontief. Fellner served on the Council of Economic Advisers from 1973 to 1975.

References

External links 
 

1905 births
1983 deaths
Hungarian emigrants to the United States
20th-century American economists
Humboldt University of Berlin alumni
Yale University faculty
Yale Sterling Professors
Writers from Budapest
Fellows of the Econometric Society
Presidents of the American Economic Association
Distinguished Fellows of the American Economic Association
United States Council of Economic Advisers
Member of the Mont Pelerin Society